The Dakota Student is the student-run newspaper publication of the University of North Dakota in Grand Forks, North Dakota. The newspaper was first published in 1888, but went through several short lived name changes. It grew out of a publication of the UND Adelphi Literary Society named The Oracle, which was likely a literary magazine. In 1928, it was again called The Dakota Student and has been published twice-weekly under the same name ever since. The Dakota Student is independent from the University of North Dakota, but it still receives some funding from the Board of Student Publications (BOSP). BOSP is in charge of hiring the editor-in-chief for the following academic year each spring.

The Dakota Student has a circulation of 6,500.  It is distributed free of charge to students who may pick it up at several campus locations. Subscriptions are not available. The newspaper employs approximately 50 students as editors, ad setters, ad representatives, writers, columnists, and photographers, and is headquartered on the lower level of the Memorial Union building.

Awards 
2017 ACP Best of the Midwest 4-year weekly single publication - Fifth Place
2017 ACP Best of the Midwest 4-year weekly web design - Eighth Place

Controversy
In Feb 2019 there was backlash after the Dakota Student printed a paper with the headline "Halftime Performance or Pornography". Critics said that the article was victim blaming, the student ran paper later apologized for the story.

References

External links
The Dakota Student website

Greater Grand Forks
Student newspapers published in North Dakota
University of North Dakota